General elections were held in San Marino on 29 May 1938. After it had taken over the country in April 1923, the Sammarinese Fascist Party was the only party to contest the elections, winning all 60 seats.

Electoral system
Voters had to be citizens of San Marino, male, 24 years old and meet at least one of the following requirements:
the head of the family,
a graduate,
belong to the militia,
have an annual income above 55 lire.

Results

References

San Marino
General elections in San Marino
General
One-party elections
San Marino